Mexican Summer is an independent record label founded in 2009 by Keith Abrahamsson and Andres Santo Domingo. Based in Brooklyn, New York, the label has released recordings from artists including Best Coast, Kurt Vile, Ariel Pink, Allah-Las, Weyes Blood, Connan Mockasin, Jessica Pratt, and Cate Le Bon. The label is named after the song "Mexican Summer" by Marissa Nadler.

In 2013, T: The New York Times Style Magazine described the label as "a bastion for experimental pop, not to mention a model for successful music publishing in the 21st century."

History 
Mexican Summer began in fall 2008 as a subscription service for limited edition, ornately packaged vinyl pieces. On September 2, 2008, they released their first 12" vinyl single Sätt Att Se, from the Swedish rock band, Dungen. “I think the whole idea of Mexican Summer really just came because I wanted to try to develop artists in a different way,” said Abrahamsson. The label continued to add bands to its roster, including early releases from Washed Out, Real Estate, Kurt Vile, and The Tallest Man on Earth.

In October 2009 Mexican Summer opened Co-Op 87, a brick and mortar store in Greenpoint with several other record labels, an idea Santo Domingo called a "vinyl co-op store." In 2011, the label established a recording studio in the same location, Gary's Electric. A second record store, Brooklyn Record Exchange, was opened in March 2019 in Bushwick.

In 2011, Mexican Summer and Kemado Records introduced a new subsidiary label called Software Recording Co. (2011-2016). It was run by Daniel Lopatin, who records under the name Oneohtrix Point Never. Software Recording Co. focused mainly on experimental electronic and dance music. The label's inaugural release was a collaborative album with Lopatin and Joel Ford, Channel Pressure. In March 2016, the label released their final album, Arcology, from Thug Entrancer.

Over the years, Mexican Summer has expanded its catalog to over 200 releases across multiple formats. The label's roster includes releases from Tamaryn, Allah-Las, The Alps, Weekend, and No Joy. One of the label's largest successes was the 2010 release of Crazy For You, the debut album from Best Coast. Additionally, Weyes Blood released her second album, The Innocents (October 2014), and her third album, Front Row Seat to Earth (October 2016), which was met with great acclaim throughout the music industry. In September 2017, Ariel Pink released his first solo LP on the label, Dedicated to Bobby Jameson.

Mexican Summer also launched Anthology Recordings in 2014 as its reissue imprint, serving vinyl and formats unforeseen.

Since 2014, Mexican Summer and contemporary arts nonprofit Ballroom Marfa have organized the annual music festival and multidisciplinary cultural program, Marfa Myths, held in Marfa, Texas. Marfa Myths showcases established and emerging artists, with notable performers including Roky Erickson, Annette Peacock, Pharoah Sanders, Kelsey Lu, Deerhunter, Amen Dunes, No Age, and Wire.

In November 2018, Mexican Summer celebrated the label's 10th anniversary with "A Decade Deeper," an all day festival at Pioneer Works, a cultural center in Red Hook, Brooklyn. Performers included Ariel Pink, Allah-Las, Tonstartssbandht, F.J. McMahon, Quilt, Jess Williamson, Drugdealer, Jefre Cantu-Ledesma, Part Time, Pill, Arp, Dungen, Cate Le Bon, Photay, and Ben Steidel.

The label is distributed in the United States through Caroline Distribution by way of Universal Music Group, and in the United Kingdom and Europe through The Orchard.

Roster

Allah-Las
Andras Fox
Andrew Graham & Swarming Branch
Apache Dropout
Arp
Ashrae Fax
Beaches
Best Coast
BI
Bipolar Bear
Black Moth Super Rainbow
Bobb Trimble
Brain Idea
Campfires
Cate Le Bon
Cold Showers
Connan Mockasin
Date Palms
Dimples
Drugdealer
Dunes
Dungen
Eddy Current Suppression Ring
Farmer Dave Scher
Ford & Lopatin
Fraction
Gauntlet Hair
Golden Triangle
GR
Greg Ashley
Gregg Kowalsky
Happy Jawbone Family Band
Hayden Pedigo
Headdress
Home Blitz
Iceage
Jacuzzi Boys
Jefre Cantu-Ledesma
Jess Williamson
Jessica Pratt
John Carpenter
Jorge Elbrecht
Kurt Vile
La Hell Gang
Lace Curtain
Lansing-Dreiden
Light Asylum
Lilacs & Champagne
Linda Perhacs
Little Girls
Lower Plenty
L'Rain
Lucky Luke
Marissa Nadler
Michael Angelo
Mike Wexler
Mood Rings
Nachtmystium
Nite Jewel
No Joy
Omri Keren
Orkustra
PAINT
Peaking Lights
Peter Matthew Bauer
Photay
Pill
Pink Playground
Purling Hiss
Puro Instinct
Quilt
Radio People
Ramases
Real Estate
Robert Lester Folsom
Shadow Band
Soldiers of Fortune
Spectral Park
Steve Moore
Tamaryn
Teams vs Star Slinger
Terrible Truths
The Alps
The Amazing
The Bitters
The Black Ryder
The Fresh & Onlys
The Mantles
The Miracles Club
The Samps
The Soft Pack
The Tallest Man on Earth
The Vacant Lots
The Young
TK Webb
Tonstartssbandht
Torn Hawk
Travis Bretzer
True Widow
Turning Shrines
Valet
VietNam
Viva L'American Death Ray Music
Washed Out
Weekend
Weyes Blood
Wooden Shjips
Woodsman
Xander Duell
Young Prisms
Zig Zags

References

2008 establishments in New York City
American independent record labels